The fourth series of the renminbi was introduced between 1987 and 1997 by the People's Bank of China. The theme of this series was that under the governance of the Chinese Communist Party, the various peoples of China would be united in building a Chinese-style social democracy.

To present this theme, the ¥100 note features four people important to the founding of the People's Republic of China: Mao Zedong, Zhou Enlai, Liu Shaoqi, and Zhu De. The ¥50 note features an intellectual, a farmer, and an industrial worker, characteristic Chinese communist images. The other banknotes show portraits of people from 14 different ethnic groups found in China, especially ethnic minorities.

Banknotes were introduced in denominations of 0.1, 0.2, 0.5 (1, 2, 5 jiao), 1, 2, 5, 10, 50 and 100 yuan. Coins were introduced in denominations of 0.1, 0.5 and 1 yuan. The banknotes were dated 1980, 1990, or 1996 to indicate different editions. Unlike the second and the third series, they are still legal tender although only the smaller denominations (smaller than ¥1) remain in widespread circulation.

On March 22, 2018, the People's Bank of China announced the Fourth series of the renminbi (excluding ¥0.1 and ¥0.5 banknotes and ¥0.5 and ¥1 coins) would be recalled on April 30. After that date, notes of the Fourth series of the renminbi can be exchanged at any bank branch until April 30, 2019.

Date of issue
April 27, 1987: ¥50 (1980 edition) and ¥0.5.
May 10, 1988: ¥100 (1980 edition), ¥2 (1980 edition), ¥1 (1980 edition) and ¥0.2 banknotes.
September 22, 1988: ¥10, ¥5 and ¥0.1 banknotes.
June 1, 1992: ¥1, ¥0.5 and ¥0.1 coins.
August 20, 1992: ¥50 (1990 edition) and ¥100 (1990 edition) banknotes.
March 1, 1995: ¥1 (1990 edition) banknote.
April 10, 1996: ¥2 (1990 edition) banknote.
April 1, 1997: ¥1 (1996 edition) banknote.

Coins
Minted from 1991 to 1999 except that ¥0.5 was last minted in 2001. Coins carry the Emblem of the People's Republic of China, the full title of the state in Chinese and pinyin on the obverse side, and the denomination and an image of a flower on the reverse side.

Banknotes

References

External links

Pictures of the 4th and 5th series, along with comments in English

Coins of China
Banknotes of China
Renminbi
Currencies introduced in 1987
Chinese numismatics